Dilip Mitra (1926 – 1992) was an Indian swimmer. He competed in the men's 100 metre freestyle at the 1948 Summer Olympics.

References

External links
 

1926 births
1992 deaths
Indian male swimmers
Olympic swimmers of India
Swimmers at the 1948 Summer Olympics
Place of birth missing
Date of birth missing
20th-century Indian people